{{Infobox university
| image = 
Ahvaz Jundishapur University of Medical Sciences
| name = Ahvaz Jundishapur University of Medical Sciences
| native_name = دانشگاه علوم پزشکی جندی‌ شاپوراهواز  Daneshgāh-e olum pezeshki-ye Jondi Shāpur-e Ahvāz.'
| established = 1955
| type = Public
| city = Ahvaz
| state = Khuzestan
| country = Iran
| president = Prof. Mohammad Hossein Sarmast Shushtari
| campus = Urban
| administrative_staff = 15,000
| website = www.ajums.ac.ir
}}
Ahvaz Jundishapur University of Medical Sciences (AJUMS) is a medical school in Khuzestan Province of Iran.

Located in southwestern Iran in the city of Ahvaz, the university was established as a College of Medicine'' administered by the Shahid Chamran University of Ahvaz in 1955, which itself was a revived reincarnation of the ancient Academy of Gundishapur that existed in the same area in antiquity. The university separated and fell under the Ministry of Health and Medical Education of Iran in 1986.

The university has 3 campuses in Ahvaz, Behbahan, and Abadan, and is constituted of 9 Schools, offering doctorate degrees in science and medicine in 27 fields.

The university administers 8 public hospitals in the city of Ahvaz, and 20 other hospitals in the surrounding areas, as well as dozens of clinics scattered across the province.

Faculties 
Faculty of Pharmacy: The faculty of pharmacy is the only pharmacy faculty in the south of Iran. It was established in 1974.  The educational program offered in this school are based upon Iran's nationwide educational schedule prepared by the Ministry of Health and Medical Education of Iran. The degrees available in this faculty are Doctorate of Pharmacy (for Pharmacy students), Ph.D. in Pharmacology, Ph.D. in Pharmaceutics and MSc in Toxicology.
Faculty of Medicine
Faculty of Allied Health sciences: the School of Hospital Sciences was established at the university in 1972. The school offered programs in the fields of laboratory sciences, radiology sciences, and maritime sciences. The school was renamed afterward to a school of Para-Medicine Sciences. The Para-Medicine school expanded its programs to nutrition sciences, laboratory sciences, anesthesiology, library and information sciences, radiology sciences and health information technology sciences. Prof. Dr. Mohammad Taha Jalali is the dean of the Para-medicine School.
Faculty of Health
Faculty of Dentistry
Faculty of Nursing: the nursing and midwifery faculty was established in October 1968. It began by accepting 20 nursing students per year.  Students attend a three-year program and received a certificate equivalent to a bachelor's degree. In 1970 the program was extended to four years and enrolled 30 nursing students per year. In 1986, the Ministry of Health and treatment was established and all faculties were transferred to Ahvaz Medical University. At this time three majors were offered: nursing, midwifery and operating room technician.  A postgraduate degree (Master's degree) in both nursing and midwifery was offered in 1993, covering medical-surgical, psychiatric nursing and pediatric nursing as well as a master's degree program for midwifery and an associate degree of Emergency Medical Technician. In 2008, this school began a Nursing Ph.D. program.  In 2016 297 students enrolled in bachelor's degree of nursing, 175 in bachelor's degree of midwifery, 91 in master's degree of nursing, 85 in master's degree of midwifery, 41 in bachelor's degree of operating room and 114 in straight bachelor's degree of operation room and 19 in the Ph.D. program.

Scientific journals 
Jundishapur Journal of Microbiology (Editor in chief, Professor Ali Zarei Mahmoudabadi, mycologist)
Jundishapur Journal of Natural Pharmaceutical Products
Jentashapir Journal of Health Research
Jundishapur Journal of Chronic Disease Care
Jundishapur Journal of Health Sciences
Jundishapur Journal of Oncology

References

External links 
Official website
imam khomeini hospital
7th Iranian Congress of Medical Physics at AJUMS, 2006
Emergency Medicine Department

Medical schools in Iran
Nursing schools in Iran
Universities in Iran
Educational institutions established in 1955
Education in Khuzestan Province
Ahvaz
1955 establishments in Iran
Buildings and structures in Khuzestan Province